Antra is a Latvian feminine given name. The associated name day is July 8.

Notable people named Antra
Antra Liedskalniņa (1930–2000), Latvian actress

References 

Latvian feminine given names
Feminine given names